Guzmania andreettae is a species of plant in the family Bromeliaceae. It is endemic to Ecuador.  Its natural habitat is subtropical or tropical moist montane forests.

References

andreettae
Endemic flora of Ecuador
Vulnerable plants
Taxonomy articles created by Polbot